is a Japanese word meaning "ignore", "take no notice of" or "treat with silent contempt". It is frequently cited to argue that problems encountered by Japanese in the sphere of international politics arise from misunderstandings or mistranslations of their language.

In 1945, mokusatsu was used in Japan's initial rejection of the Potsdam Declaration, the Allied demand that Japan surrender unconditionally in World War II. To this day, the argument, or myth, that mokusatsu was misunderstood, and that the misunderstanding interrupted a negotiation for a peaceful end to the war, still resurfaces from time to time. The consensus of modern historians is that the Allies had understood the word correctly.

Usage
It was the adoption of this term by the government of Japan that first gave rise to the prominence of the word abroad. In 1945, mokusatsu was used in Japan's initial rejection of the Potsdam Declaration, where the Allies demanded Japan to surrender unconditionally in World War II. This was understood to mean that Japan had rejected those terms, which contributed to President Harry S. Truman's decision to carry out the atomic bombings of Hiroshima and Nagasaki, and implied that in spurning the terms, Japan had brought down on its own head the destruction of those two cities.

In 1950, an argument emerged claiming that mokusatsu had been misunderstood by the Allies due to a mistranslation that interpreted the word to signify ignore rather than withhold comment. The third edition of the authoritative Kenkyūsha Japanese-English dictionary (1954) responded by adding an innovative gloss to its former definitions by stating that it also bore the meaning of 'remain in a wise and masterly inactivity'. However, the context around the word makes the intended meaning clear, and even if the new definition added in 1954 was used, it would not change the overall meaning of the statement.

Context

The Allies were aware that within the Japanese government an attempt to reach a negotiated termination of hostilities had been underway, especially via diplomatic contacts with Moscow, which was still neutral. On 12 July 1945 Tōgō Shigenori, the Japanese Foreign Minister, asked Naotake Sato to inform Moscow, on behalf of the Emperor, that Japan had no alternative but to see the war through to the end using an all-out war effort if England and the United States were to persist in demanding an unconditional surrender.

The Potsdam declaration presented one further occasion for mediation, but it was strongly opposed by the War Minister General Korechika Anami, with backing from the army and navy chiefs of staff, all demanding that the Declaration be rejected with a broadcast containing a point by point rebuttal. The Army also demanded that the public be kept unaware of the Declaration. In a compromise, the Foreign Minister Tōgō Shigenori gained a Cabinet consensus to have the Declaration translated and released to the public, but in a censored version that deleted mentions of an imminent "utter destruction of the Japanese homeland,"  "stern justice" for all war criminals, that disarmed soldiers would be allowed to return home to live constructive lives in peace, and comments about "self-willed military cliques." The version given to the public was issued by the 'tightly controlled press' through the Dōmei News Service.

In this form it appeared in the morning edition of the Asahi Shimbun on 28 July 1945, to designate the attitude assumed by the government to the Potsdam Declaration. This newspaper and others clearly stated that the ultimatum, which had not only been transmitted to the Japanese government diplomatically via Swiss intermediaries but also to the Japanese public via radio and airdropped leaflets, was formally rejected by the Imperial Government. Later that day in a press conference, the Premier Suzuki Kantarō himself publicly used it to dismiss the Potsdam Declaration as a mere rehash (yakinaoshi) of earlier rejected Allied proposals, and therefore, being of no value.

The key part of the statement was translated into English by Dōmei Press as "the Japanese government ignores this, and we are determined to continue our bitter fight to the end."

Three postwar translations of Suzuki's statement in context exist:

'I believe the Joint Proclamation by the three countries is nothing but a rehash of the Cairo Declaration. As for the Government, it does not find any important value in it, and there is no other recourse but to ignore it entirely and resolutely fight for the successful conclusion of this war.'

"My thinking is that the joint declaration is virtually the same as the Cairo Declaration. The government of Japan does not consider it having any crucial value. We simply . The only alternative for us is to be determined to continue our fight till the end."

and:

"I think that the joint statement is a rehash of the Cairo Declaration. The government does not think that it has serious value. We can only ignore [] it. We will do our utmost to complete the war to the bitter end."

Suzuki apparently recognized that the Potsdam declaration flagged an intention to end a war which, in logistical terms, Japan was no longer capable of sustaining. However Article 6 stated that the militarists would be stripped of their authority and power forever, and the Japanese army was resolutely opposed to its own thorough dismantlement, and heavy pressure was brought to bear on the Prime Minister therefore to have him reject the declaration.

Suzuki's stating that the declaration's terms would be literally 'killed off by silent contempt' (mokusatsu) reflected this necessity of placating the extreme position of the army. John Toland also argued decades later that Suzuki's choice of the term was dictated more by the need to appease the military, which was hostile to the idea of "unconditional surrender", than to signal anything to the Allies.

Although mokusatsu may not have been intended to communicate to the Allies a refusal to surrender, the Potsdam ultimatum nevertheless allowed for only one acceptable answer: unconditional surrender. Any other answer would, as the declaration warned, cause "prompt and utter destruction". It was only after the destruction of Hiroshima and Nagasaki by atomic bombs, two assassination attempts on the then Prime Minister Suzuki Kantarō, an attempted military coup against the Emperor, and declaration of war by the Soviet Union that the Emperor himself broadcast acceptance of the terms of the Potsdam Declaration that resulted in Japan's unconditional surrender, which ended the Pacific War.

Postwar controversy
Five years after the end of World War II, Kazuo Kawai, a lecturer in Far Eastern history at Stanford University, first raised the idea that an incorrect translation directly led to the bombing of Hiroshima. Kawai based his argument on notes and diaries written at the time, notes taken while he covered the discussions underway in Japan's Foreign Office regarding the Declaration. Kawai argued that both the choice of this term and the meaning given to it by Allied authorities led to a fatal 'tragedy of errors' involving both Japanese bureaucratic bungling and a 'deficiency in perception' by Japan's enemies. Kawai's point was then taken up by William J. Coughlin in a widely read article for Harper's magazine three years later.

In some reconstructions that espouse this interpretation, it is stated that it was probably Hasegawa Saiji, a translator for Dōmei Press, who translated this as: "The Japanese ignores this, and we are determined to continue our fight until the end" and the foreign press picked this up, taking "ignore" to mean "reject".

The NSA Technical Journal published an article endorsing this view, that the word's meaning was ambiguous, in which readers are warned of the consequences of not making ambiguities clear when translating between languages. It concluded:

To this day, the argument, or myth, that mokusatsu was misunderstood, and that the misunderstanding interrupted a negotiation for a peaceful end to the war, still resurfaces from time to time.

The consensus of modern historians is that the Allies had understood the word correctly. Chalmers Johnson wrote in 1980:
Since the characters for mokusatsu mean 'silent kill,' most informed commentators believe that the Allies did not mistranslate Suzuki. If he really meant 'no comment', that is not what he said – and mokusatsu does not imply it, even obliquely. However, the fact that the Japanese and Emmerson maintain that Suzuki's nuance was misunderstood illustrates the tendency of the Japanese to take refuge in alleged mistranslations.

Likewise, Herbert Bix concluded:
'"No need to rush" directly contravened Article 5 of the Potsdam Declaration
("We shall brook no delay") and as a position that further strengthened the contemporary Western analysis that, as of 28 July, the Japanese, following the leadership of their emperor, had neither reversed their decision, nor loosened their will to fight to the finish, while making vague overtures for peace on a separate track. Suzuki's intention was not misunderstood.'

Notes

Footnotes

Citations

Sources 

Japanese words and phrases
Military terminology
Translation